Pirandamine (AY-23,713) is a tricyclic derivative which acts as a selective serotonin reuptake inhibitor (SSRI). It was investigated in the 1970s as a potential antidepressant but clinical development was not commenced and it was never marketed. Pirandamine is structurally related to tandamine, which, in contrast, is a selective norepinephrine reuptake inhibitor.

Synthesis

Condensation of 1-indanone (1) with ethyl bromoacetate and zinc affords Reformatsky reaction product 2; then reduction with LiAlH4 gives diol 3. Dehydration with H2SO4 gives the indene ethanol 4. Acid catalyzed condensation of 4 with ethyl acetoacetate then gives the fused tetrahydropyran derivative 5 (no doubt by a scheme quite analogous to prodolic acid). The ester is then saponified to the corresponding acid, which is then converted to the dimethylamide (6). Reduction with LiAlH4 completes the synthesis of the antidepressant agent pirandamine (7).

See also 
 Tandamine
Prindamine (21489-22-5)

References 

Dihydropyrans